is a dam on the Tandogawa River, a branch of the Kitakami River in Morioka, Iwate Prefecture, Japan, completed in 1960.

History
The need for storage reservoirs in the Kitakami River valley for irrigation purposes was recognized by the Meiji government at the start of the 20th century, due to repeated crop failures and conflicts between various communities over water rights. The river also suffered from severe environmental problems with acidic runoff from upstream mining operations. Plans for a series of dams was initiated in 1941 by the Ministry of Agriculture and Forestry, but all work was halted during World War II. The plan was revived after the war, and the Gandō Dam was the second to be completed after the Sannōkai Dam.

Design
The Gandō Dam was constructed to provide irrigation water, and also to supply the 41,000 KW Gandō No.1 Hydroelectric Plant and 8,300 KW Gandō No.2 Power Plants. The design of the dam is that of a sloped wall rockfill dam. The dam was completed in 1960 by the Taisei Corporation.

The Gandō Reservoir created by the dam has been stocked with carp and Japanese smelt and is a popular vacation location due to its ease of access via Japan National Route 455.

References

External links

Familiar and Invaluable 100 Selected Dam Lakes 
Japan Dam network 

Dams in Iwate Prefecture
Dams completed in 1960
Hydroelectric power stations in Japan
Morioka, Iwate